The 1958 South American Basketball Championship for Women was the 7th regional tournament for women in South America. It was held in Lima, Peru and won by Brazil. Five teams competed.

Final rankings

Results

Each team played the other teams twice, for a total of eight games played by each team.

External links
FIBA Archive

South
B
1958 in Peruvian sport
Sports competitions in Lima
South American Basketball Championship for Women
April 1958 sports events in South America
May 1958 sports events in South America
1950s in Lima